Lauren Breadmore (born 1 June 1983) is a former professional tennis player from Australia.

Biography
Born in Melbourne, Breadmore attended Wesley College where she graduated in 2001 with an VCE score of 99.1 and was awarded the Alexander Wawn Scholar Dux Award.

From 2002, she competed on the international tennis circuit. In 2003, she won both the singles and doubles titles at an ITF tournament in Wellington. In 2004, she made the first of her three main-draw appearances in women's doubles at the Australian Open. At the beginning of the 2005 season, she made her WTA Tour singles main-draw debut at the Canberra Women's Classic, which remained her only appearance at that level. She featured in a total of 36 professional tournaments in 2005, as well as at the Summer Universiade in Turkey. Her titles in 2005 included a $25,000 tournament in Lyneham, Canberra. She received a wildcard into the main draw of the 2006 Australian Open and was beaten in the first round by 14th seed Svetlana Kuznetsova. She made only the occasional appearance from 2008, before retiring in 2011.

During her tennis career, she studied for a commerce degree at the University of Melbourne. Graduating in 2010, she now works as a management consultant. In 2014, she became a board member of the Australian Davis Cup Tennis Foundation.

ITF Circuit finals

Singles: 6 (3–3)

Doubles: 9 (2–7)

References

External links
 
 

1983 births
Living people
Australian female tennis players
Tennis players from Melbourne
People educated at Wesley College (Victoria)
University of Melbourne alumni